The San Miguel Philharmonic Orchestra (SMPO) was one of the two major performing arts groups (along with the San Miguel Master Chorale) under the San Miguel Foundation for the Performing Arts. As a young ensemble, its wide selection of works encompassing musical genres attests to its versatility and dynamism. Together with the SMMC, the SMPO aspired to produce and perform new orchestral works that will ensure the growth and development of Filipino music.

The SMPO, together with the San Miguel Master Chorale, was disbanded in late January 2007 by the San Miguel Corporation.

Disbandment

In a swift and silent move, the big bosses of the San Miguel Corporation (SMC) have already disbanded the SMPO and the SMMC. Late January 2007, instrumentalists of the SMPO and SMMC were summoned one by one by the big bosses who informed them of the non-renewal of their contracts. Many of the performers did not get any separation pay. Insider reports say that the SMC was "more inclined" on supporting its four professional basketball teams. No word yet on what happened to Ryan Cayabyab, the SMFPA's Executive and artistic director.

Discography

Great Filipino Love Songs

The SMPO has been featured in all the existing SMFPA albums to date, but its first solo album, Great Filipino Love Songs (GFLS), was a bestseller in major record bars and a certified gold record, thereby breaking records of sorts when it was released in 2004.

GFLS was the first locally produced album to feature full-blown orchestral arrangements of well-known Filipino classics. It was produced and recorded in a span of 3 years.
It emerged as No. 2 album in sales charts upon its release in 2004, and after a week became No. 1, surpassing the sales of contemporary mainstream artists like Usher, Josh Groban, Maroon 5, Beyoncé, and Evanescence.
According to sales reports, the album has been bought by bulk by many customers as presents and give-aways among families and corporations for all occasions.
The album earned phenomenal success despite minimal advertising.

Track List:
Bato sa Buhangin
Maalaala Mo Kaya
Ikaw
Minamahal Kita
Dahil Sa Iyo
Hindi Kita Malimot
Ang Tangi Kong Pag-ibig
Buhat
Gaano Ko Ikaw Kamahal
Ikaw ang Mahal Ko
Katakataka
Minamahal, Sinasamba
Saan Ka Man Naroroon
Lahat ng Araw

Great Original Pilipino Music

Created  by Ryan Cayabyab. All songs in the album composed and arranged by Ryan Cayabyab. All songs recorded in 2001, except tracks 5, 8, and 9, which are SMMC a capella tracks and were recorded in 2004. This album received three nominations in the 18th Awit Awards aside from winning Best Musical Arrangement for Tuwing Umuulan at Kapiling Ka. Certified Gold Record.

Tuwing Umuulan at Kapiling Ka (winner, 18th Awit Awards, Best Musical Arrangement)
Iduyan Mo
Kahit Ika'y Panaginip Lang
Paraisong Parisukat
Tunay na Ligaya
Nais Ko
Limandipang Tao
Tsismis
Da Coconut Nut
Iniibig Kita
Paraiso
Awit ng Pagsinta (Epithalamium) - from Ryan Cayabyab and Bienvenido Lumbera's pop-ballet Rama Hari; lyrics by Lumbera
Hibang sa Awit - lyrics by Jose Javier Reyes

Pasko I

Festive Filipino Christmas classics, all songs arranged & conducted by Ryan Cayabyab and performed by the SMPO and the SMMC. Certified Gold Record.

Kampana ng Simbahan
Heto na Naman - music and lyrics by Ryan Cayabyab
Namamasko
Tuloy na Tuloy pa rin ang Pasko
Sa Paskong Darating
Maligayang Pasko at Manigong Bagong Taon (Ang Pasko ay Sumapit)
Kumukutikutitap*
Mano Po Ninong, Mano Po Ninang
Noche Buena
Heto na Naman ang Pasko**
Maligayang Pasko**
Pasko na Naman

 * from Ryan Cayabyab and Jose Javier Reyes's musical Bituin; lyrics by Reyes
 ** from Ryan Cayabyab and Jose Javier Reyes's musical teleplay Pasko sa Amin; lyrics by Reyes

Pasko II

Mellow Filipino Christmas classics, all songs arranged & conducted by Ryan Cayabyab and performed by the SMPO and the SMMC. Certified Gold Record. Isang Taong Lumipas won as Best Christmas Song during the 19th Awit Awards.

Ngayong Pasko*
Pasko Na Sinta Ko
Paskong Walang Hanggan*
Himig Pasko
Miss Kita Kung Christmas
Isang Taong Lumipas*
Ang Aking Pamasko
Ang Mahalin Ka**
Anong Gagawin Mo Ngayong Pasko - music and lyrics by Ryan Cayabyab
Ang Naaalala Ko**
Munting Sanggol - music and lyrics by Ryan Cayabyab
Payapang Daigdig

 * music by Ryan Cayabyab, lyrics by Jose Javier Reyes
 ** from Ryan Cayabyab and Jose Javier Reyes's musical teleplay Pasko sa Amin; lyrics by Reyes

Spoliarium: The Opera

A neo-opera in three acts based on the life of renowned Filipino painter Juan Luna. Music by Ryan Cayabyab, libretto by Fides Cuyugan-Asensio.

The Filipino Classics

A collection of Filipino classics from the '20s up to the '60s. All songs arranged & conducted by Ryan Cayabyab and performed by Basil Valdez accompanied by the SMPO. Sequel albums 2 and 3 are said to be produced if this first album performs well in the market. This album became No. 1 at Tower Records in one month's time since it was released.

Diyos Lamang ang Nakakaalam
Babalik Ka Rin
Dahil Sa Isang Bulaklak
Bituing Marikit
Kung Nagsasayaw Kita
Madaling Araw
Sa Ugoy ng Duyan
Bakas ng Lumipas
Sapagka't Kami ay Tao Lamang
Lagi Kitang Naaalala
Bayan Ko
Mahiwaga

The Sacred Works of Ryan Cayabyab

Religious compositions of Cayabyab. Misa was his thesis composition for his graduation at the University of the Philippines College of Music. Misa 2000 was composed for and won as Original Music Composition for Dance in the 2000 Onassis International Cultural Competition in Greece. This album won as Best Religious Album in the 2004 Catholic Mass Media Awards.

Disc 1: 
Misa 2000
Kyrie
Gloria
Credo
Sanctus
Agnus Dei
Te Deum

Disc 2: 
Misa
Kyrie
Gloria
Credo
Sanctus
Agnus Dei
Aquesta Me Guiaba
Aba Po, Santa Mariang Reyna
Anima Christi

Beauty and the Beast

Songs from the Philippine run of the musical Beauty and the Beast, arranged and conducted by Ryan Cayabyab, performed by the musical's main cast with the SMPO and the SMMC.

Home (KC Concepcion)
Beauty and the Beast (show version by Pinky Marquez)
A Change in Me (KC Concepcion)
If I Can't Love Her (Jett Pangan)
Beauty and the Beast (pop version by Luke Mijares)

Great Original Pilipino Music from the Movies

Well-known and well-loved theme songs from Filipino movies from 1977 to 2002. Recorded live in July 2006 and released December of that year. Mainly featuring the SMMC, accompanied by the SMPO. Choral arrangements by Ryan Cayabyab, Jesus Carlo Merino, Ed Nepomuceno and Nathanael Arnel de Pano (the latter 2 being section leaders of the SMMC Tenors and Basses, respectively), and Eudenice Palaruan (SMMC Principal Conductor). All orchestrations by Ryan Cayabyab.

Sana'y Wala Nang Wakas
Kahit Isang Saglit
Pangako
Pangarap Na Bituin
Pagdating Ng Panahon
Kailangan Kita
Hanggang Sa Dulo Ng Walang Hanggan
Kailangan Ko'y Ikaw
Iduyan Mo - music and lyrics by Ryan Cayabyab, from the movie "Agila" (1980)
Hanggang Ngayon
Tanging Yaman
Sinasamba Kita
Ikaw Lang Ang Mamahalin
Gaano Kadalas Ang Minsan
Paraisong Parisukat - music and lyrics by Ryan Cayabyab, from the movie "Masikip, Maluwang...Paraisong Parisukat" (1977)

Dancing in the Rain

An album featuring Ryan Cayabyab's talent as a pianist in his own right, accompanied by the SMPO & SMMC. Recorded live in August 2006 and released December of that year. Entire track list composed, arranged, and produced by Ryan Cayabyab.

First Glance
Feels Like This Love Affair Is Gonna Last Forever
Frap For Two On A Beach In Cebu
Photographs Of You And Me, Together
Like Children Dancing In The Rain With Nothing On
Alone, Drenched In The Red, Orange and Gold Of A Manila Sunset
Grey Clouds! Grey Clouds! Its Beginning To Drizzle
Its Getting More Difficult To Explain Why I Do Things The Way That I Do
Almost Sunup And I Haven't Slept
Last Trip To Boracay
This Is Beginning To Sound Like An Old Song
It Isn't The First Time Someone Left Me
Letting Go
Last Look

Future Albums

Other music albums are said to be in the pipeline, like:
A compilation of popular folk songs representative of different regions in the Philippines; e.g., "Atin Cu Pung Singsing," "Usahay, "Ay, Kalisud," and "Sarungbanggi."
A compilation of popular novelty songs including "Ocho-ocho," "Pito-pito," and possibly "Boom Tarat-Tarat," all to be performed in symphonic style.

References

http://www.sanmiguelperformingarts.com The SMFPA Official Website as archived from 
Manila Bulletin Online: Great Filipino Love Songs Tops the Charts
UPMASA: Featuring Maestro Ryan Cayabyab
INQ7.net: Basil Valdez Revives Filipino Classics
INQ7.net: Surprise hit inspires more recordings from SMC Orchestra
INQ7.net: New Year Shock: San Miguel kills orchestra, chorale

2001 establishments in the Philippines
2007 disestablishments in the Philippines
Filipino orchestras
Disbanded orchestras
Musical groups established in 2001
Musical groups disestablished in 2007
San Miguel Corporation people